William Phillips Sr. (1722–1804) was a Boston merchant, politician, and a major benefactor of Phillips Academy in Andover, Massachusetts.

Biography
He was a son of Samuel Phillips, pastor of the South Church in Andover, and was a descendant of George Phillips of Watertown, the progenitor of the New England Phillips family in America.

Unlike his brothers, Phillips did not attend Harvard College, instead embarking on a career in the merchant trade, working in the warehouse of merchant Edward Bromfield. He eventually became Bromfield's business partner, and married his daughter Abigail in 1744.

In the 1760s Phillips became active in Boston politics, serving as a town selectman from 1767.  He was active on committees established to organize opposition to unpopular British policies, including one to organize agreement and enforcement of a ban in the importation of goods from Britain subject to taxes imposed by the Townshend Acts.  He was on a committee headed by Samuel Adams and John Hancock to deal with the aftermath of the Boston Massacre in 1770.  In 1772 he was elected to the provincial assembly along with Adams, Hancock, and Thomas Cushing.  Governor Thomas Gage rejected his election to the governor's council in 1774.  That same year he sat on a committee established to determine who would need assistance when the Port of Boston was closed by Gage's implementation of the Boston Port Act.

When the American Revolutionary War broke out in 1775, Phillips relocated his family from occupied Boston to Norwich, Connecticut, where they occupied the childhood home of Benedict Arnold.  He sat in the convention of 1779-80 that drafted the Massachusetts State Constitution, and also in the state convention that ratified the United States Constitution.  He served during the 1780s as a state representative and senator.

He became interested in the project of an academy at Andover as outlined by his nephew Samuel Phillips. He gave the academy an amount equal to that contributed by his brother Samuel. He succeeded his brother as president of the academy's board of trustees, but only served a few years before age and infirmity compelled his retirement.

He was father to William Phillips Jr., father-in-law to Josiah Quincy II, who married his daughter, Abigail Phillips, and grandfather to Josiah Quincy III. and great grandfather of Samuel H. Walley.

Notes and references
"William Phillips and William Phillips", New England Historical and Genealogical Register

External links

1722 births
1804 deaths
American businesspeople
American philanthropists
Members of the colonial Massachusetts House of Representatives
Members of the Massachusetts House of Representatives
Massachusetts state senators
Phillips family (New England)
18th-century philanthropists